Knox County Regional Airport  is a county-owned, public-use airport in the town of Owls Head, Knox County, Maine, United States. It is located three nautical miles (6 km) south of the central business district of Rockland, Maine. The airport serves the residents of midcoast Maine with commercial and charter aviation services. Scheduled airline service is subsidized by the Essential Air Service program. It is also a major hub of freight and mail service to Maine's island communities including Matinicus, North Haven and Vinalhaven.

As per Federal Aviation Administration records, the airport had 13,866 passenger boardings (enplanements) in calendar year 2008, 14,461 enplanements in 2009, and 17,657 in 2010. It is included in the National Plan of Integrated Airport Systems for 2011–2015, which categorized it as a primary commercial service airport (more than 10,000 enplanements per year).

During the summer months, the airport is one of Maine's busiest, with significant private jet operations bringing visitors to the numerous summer colonies in the Penobscot Bay region. The influx in traffic in recent years prompted the implementation of a voluntary night curfew on arrivals and departures between 10:30 p.m. and 6:00 a.m.

Owls Head Transportation Museum is also situated at the airport on the remains of runway 17/35, a third runway that is now abandoned. It has a museum of antique autos, aircraft, and engines. During the summer special event gatherings are held for enthusiasts.

History
The airport was built during World War II and became locally known as the "Ash Point Naval Air Station" while officially operating as Rockland Naval Auxiliary Air Facility (NAAF) from April 15, 1943, until February 1, 1946.  With the familiar triangle of runways (the third runway was discontinued in the 1970s) it was one of a string of military airports along the Maine coast supporting operations of Naval Air Station Brunswick.

After the war, it was operated by the City of Rockland until 1968. It was then turned over to Knox County and renamed Knox County Regional Airport. Since that time, the airport has been developed, the runways expanded, and an Instrument Landing System (ILS) was installed.

Facilities and aircraft
Knox County Regional Airport covers an area of 538 acres (218 ha) at an elevation of 56 feet (17 m) above mean sea level. It has two asphalt paved runways: 13/31 is 5,007 by 100 feet (1,526 × 30 m) and 3/21 is 4,000 by 100 feet (1,219 × 30 m).

For the 12-month period ending July 31, 2010, the airport had 55,125 aircraft operations, an average of 151 per day: 76% general aviation, 18% air taxi, 5% scheduled commercial, and <1% military. At that time there were 79 aircraft based at this airport: 95% single-engine, 3% multi-engine, 1% jet, and 1% helicopter.

Airlines and destinations

Passenger

Accidents and incidents
In 1979, Downeast Flight 46 crashed on approach to the airport when the pilots descended below the minimum allowable altitude in difficult weather and failed to correct their error. All but 1 on board were killed.

Citations

Other sources

 Essential Air Service documents (Docket OST-1997-2784) from the U.S. Department of Transportation:
 Order 2004-10-16 (October 25, 2004): reselecting Colgan Air, Inc., to provide subsidized Essential Air Service (EAS) at Presque Isle/Houlton, Augusta/Waterville, Bar Harbor and Rockland, Maine, for a two-year period at a combined annual subsidy rate of $4,312,849.
 Order 2006-8-24 (August 25, 2006): reselecting Colgan Air, Inc., operating as US Airways Express, to provide subsidized essential air service (EAS) at Presque Isle/Houlton, Augusta/Waterville, Bar Harbor, and Rockland, Maine, at a total annual subsidy rate of $4,774,068 ($3,572,592 for Augusta/Waterville, Bar Harbor, and Rockland; $1,201,476 for Presque Isle/Houlton), for the two-year period of November 1, 2006, through October 31, 2008.
  Order 2008-7-35 (July 31, 2008): selecting Hyannis Air Service, Inc. d/b/a Cape Air (Cape Air) to provide subsidized EAS at Rockland, Maine, at an annual subsidy of $1,522,770, for a two-year period beginning when Cape Air inaugurates full EAS, through the end of the 24th month thereafter.
 Order 2010-9-28 (September 28, 2010): selecting Hyannis Air Service, Inc., operating as Cape Air, to provide essential air service (EAS) at Augusta/Waterville and Rockland, Maine, for the four-year period from November 1, 2010, to October 31, 2014, for a combined annual subsidy of $2,783,161, and Colgan Air Inc., operating as US Airways Express, to provide EAS at Bar Harbor, Maine, for the two-year period from November 1, 2010, to October 31, 2012, for an annual subsidy of $2,298,533.

External links
 Knox County Regional Airport at Knox County website
 Aerial image as of May 1996 from USGS The National Map
 

Airports in Maine
Buildings and structures in Rockland, Maine
Essential Air Service
Transportation buildings and structures in Knox County, Maine